Leonard Miller may refer to:
 Leonard W. Miller (born 1934), American motor racing pioneer
 Leonard T. Miller, his son, American racing driver, pilot and author
 Leonard J. Miller (1907–1992), politician in Newfoundland, Canada
 Leonard Miller (basketball), Canadian basketball player
 Leonard M. Miller, former president and CEO of Lennar
 Leonard Miller (born 1899), owner of the British comic book publisher L. Miller & Son, Ltd.
 Leonard M. Miller School of Medicine